Oscar Peterson Jam – Montreux '77 is a 1977 live album featuring a jam session led by Oscar Peterson. At the Grammy Awards of 1979, Peterson won the Grammy Award for Best Jazz Performance by a Soloist for his performance on this album.

Track listing
 "Ali and Frazier" (Oscar Peterson) – 9:20
 "If I Were a Bell" (Frank Loesser) – 10:39
 "Things Ain't What They Used to Be" (Mercer Ellington, Ted Persons) – 12:42
 "Just in Time" (Betty Comden, Adolph Green, Jule Styne) – 9:49
 "Bye Bye Blues" (David Bennett, Chauncey Gray, Frederick Hamm, Bert Lown) – 8:06

Personnel
Recorded July 14, 1977 at the Montreux Jazz Festival, Montreux, Switzerland:

Performance
 Oscar Peterson - piano
 Eddie "Lockjaw" Davis - tenor saxophone
 Dizzy Gillespie - trumpet
 Clark Terry - trumpet
 Niels-Henning Ørsted Pedersen - double bass
 Bobby Durham - drums

Production
 Norman Granz - producer
 Giuseppe Pino - photography
 Phil DeLancie	- remastering

References

Oscar Peterson live albums
Albums produced by Norman Granz
Albums recorded at the Montreux Jazz Festival
1977 live albums
Pablo Records live albums